John William Moore (June 9, 1877 – December 11, 1941) was a U.S. Representative from Kentucky.

Born in Morgantown, Kentucky, Moore attended the public schools and completed a commercial course at Bryant and Stratton College at Louisville in 1897.
He became a clerk with the Morgantown Deposit Bank in 1898.
He engaged in the timber business 1899-1919.
Cashier for the Morgantown Deposit Bank 1920-1925.

Moore was elected as a Democrat to the Sixty-ninth Congress in a special election, to fill the vacancy caused by the death of United States Representative Robert Y. Thomas, Jr. and reelected to the succeeding Congress (December 26, 1925 – March 3, 1929).
He was an unsuccessful candidate for reelection to the Seventy-first Congress in 1928.

Moore was elected as a Democrat to the Seventy-first Congress in a special election, to fill the vacancy caused by the death of United States Representative Charles W. Roark, and reelected to the succeeding Congress (June 1, 1929 – March 3, 1933).
He was not a candidate for renomination to the Seventy-third Congress in 1932.
He resumed his former business pursuits.
He was employed in the Federal Housing Administration at Washington, D.C., as an assistant comptroller 1935-1941.
He died in Washington, D.C., December 11, 1941.
He was interred in Morgantown Cemetery, Morgantown, Kentucky.

References

1877 births
1941 deaths
Democratic Party members of the United States House of Representatives from Kentucky
People from Morgantown, Kentucky